Fotbal Club Argeș Pitești is a professional association football club based in Pitești, Romania. The club was founded in 1953.

FC Argeș Pitești played their first top league fixture on 20 August 1961 against Dinamo București. Since that game they have played in 1404 first league matches and have faced 53 different sides. Their most regular opponents have been Dinamo București, whom they have played against on 88 occasions. The club has won 32 of the league matches against Farul Constanța which represents the most Argeș have won against any team. They have drawn more matches with Petrolul Ploiești than with any other club, with 18 of their meetings finishing without a winner. Dinamo București are the side that has defeated Argeș in more league games than any other club, having won 53 of their encounters.

Key
 The table includes results of matches played by Argeș Pitești in Liga I.
   Clubs with this background and symbol in the "Club" column are defunct
 The name used for each opponent is the name they had when Argeș Pitești most recently played a league match against them. Results against each opponent include results against that club under any former name. For example, results against Universitatea Cluj include matches played against Știința Cluj.
 P = matches played; W = matches won; D = matches drawn; L = matches lost; F = goals for; A = goals against; Win% = percentage of total matches won
 The columns headed "First" and "Last" contain the first and most recent seasons in which Argeș Pitești played league matches against each opponent

All-time league record
Statistics correct as of matches played on season 2016–17.

References

General
 
 

FC Argeș Pitești
Romanian football club league records by opponent